The Charles J. and Elsa Schnabel House is a house located in southwest Portland, Oregon listed on the National Register of Historic Places. Its location on 2375 SW Park Place is in the King's Hill section of Goose Hollow.

Two large windows installed in the tradesman entrance (verified by Bosco and Milligan) were originally from the (Ferdinand) Smith Family Mansion in what is now Lair Hill Park.  Two other sets of modern geometric art glass windows in the dining room and staircase landing are attributed to Povey Brothers based on inspection by Polly Povey Thompson, daughter of designer David Povey.

See also
 National Register of Historic Places listings in Southwest Portland, Oregon

References

1907 establishments in Oregon
Arts and Crafts architecture in Oregon
Goose Hollow, Portland, Oregon
Houses completed in 1907
Houses on the National Register of Historic Places in Portland, Oregon
Individually listed contributing properties to historic districts on the National Register in Oregon
Portland Historic Landmarks